Serge Fiori (born March 4, 1952) was the lead vocalist and guitarist for Harmonium, a progressive rock band from Quebec. After Harmonium broke up he pursued a solo career.

Biography 
Serge Fiori grew up in the Little Italy district of Montreal, Canada, and made his performing debut in the ballroom orchestra of his father George Fiori. At age 18 he was working as a professional musician, and beginning to write his own material. In 1972, a friend introduced him to  who was looking for someone to write the music for a play. Although the project was not completed, the two guitarists formed Harmonium the following year, completing the trio with bassist .

Harmonium recorded three studio albums, adding members along the way to become a progressive rock group: Harmonium (1974), Si on avait besoin d'une cinquième saison (1975), and L'Heptade (1976).

When Harmonium disbanded in 1978, Fiori began collaborating with Richard Séguin to record Deux cents nuits à l'heure. This was also Séguin's first album after leaving the group . Most of the musicians from Harmonium appeared on the 1978 LP and again on Neil Chotem's Live au El Casino (1979) which included two new songs by Fiori. After that Fiori moved to Los Angeles to study meditation, computer science, and composition.

He returned to the music business in 1983 as a songwriter for other artists, namely Diane Dufresne, Nanette Workman and stand-up comic Yvon Deschamps. A year later he wrote and sang the theme song for the Montreal comedy festival Just for Laughs. He released a solo album, Fiori, in 1986. He spent the 1990s writing film scores (André Forcier's An Imaginary Tale (Une histoire inventée) in 1990, ' Hathi in 2000, and Madame Brouette in 2002, with Mamadou Diabaté and Majoly) and TV music, making a short set of public appearances in 1995 to present Gayatri, Maha Mrityunjaya and Shiva, three CDs of new-age music.

After 28 years, he released another solo album, Serge Fiori, in 2014. A tribute to the album was presented by other artists at the Montreal FrancoFolies festival that year.

In 2018, Fiori collaborated with Louis-Jean Cormier on Seul ensemble using new rerecordings of Fiori's songs for a dance and acrobatic show by Cirque Eloize that was presented in Montreal and Quebec City in 2019. A soundtrack double album was also released.

Discography

Albums
Harmonium
Harmonium (1974)
Si on avait besoin d'une cinquième saison (1975)
L'Heptade (1976)
Harmonium en tournée (1980)
Fiori-Séguin
Deux cents nuits à l'heure (1978)
Serge Fiori
Fiori (1986)
Gayatri (1994)
Maha Mrityunjaya (1994)
Shiva (1995)
Contes pour tous: Mon petit diable (2000, soundtrack)
Madame Brouette (2001, soundtrack)
Babine (2008, soundtrack)
Serge Fiori (2014)
Seul ensemble (2019)

References

External links
[ AllMusic Biography]
Canadian Encyclopedia Entry

Living people
1952 births
Canadian people of Italian descent
French-language singers of Canada
Canadian male singers
Canadian guitarists
Canadian male singer-songwriters
Canadian singer-songwriters
Canadian male guitarists
Canadian male pianists
Singers from Montreal
21st-century Canadian pianists
21st-century Canadian male musicians